Transmembrane protein 70 is a protein that in humans is encoded by the TMEM70 gene. It is a transmembrane protein located in the mitochondrial inner membrane involved in the assembly of the F1 and Fo structural subunits of ATP synthase. Mutations in this gene have been associated with neonatal mitochondrial encephalo-cardiomyopathy due to ATP synthase (Complex V) deficiency, causing a wide variety of symptoms including 3-methylglutaconic aciduria, lactic acidosis, mitochondrial myopathy, and cardiomyopathy.

Structure 
The TMEM70 gene has 4 exons and is located on the q arm of chromosome 8 in position 21.11 and spans 6,642 base pairs. The gene produces a 29 kDa protein composed of 260 amino acids. The encoded protein is a multi-pass transmembrane protein localized to the mitochondrial inner membrane. It contains two putative transmembrane regions and the conserved domain DUF1301.

Function 
The encoded protein is involved in the assembly of the F1 and Fo structural subunits of ATP synthase.

Clinical significance 
Mutations in the TMEM70 gene have been associated with neonatal mitochondrial encephalocardiomyopathy due to nuclear type 2 Complex V (ATP synthase) deficiency. There are a wide variety of possible symptoms depending on the mutation, including 3-methylglutaconic aciduria, dysmorphic features, psychomotor retardation, hypotonia, growth retardation, mitochondrial myopathy and cardiomyopathy, hepatomegaly, hypoplastic kidneys, and elevated lactate levels in urine, plasma, and cerebrospinal fluid.

Most notably, a c.317-2A→G mutation in the splice site of intron 2 of this gene caused aberrant splicing and the loss of the TMEM70 transcript. This resulted in ATP synthase deficiency symptomized by apneoic spells, hypertrophic cardiomyopathy, profound lactic acidosis, hyperammonaemia, psychomotor retardation, 3-methylglutaconic aciduria, failure to thrive, and severe muscular hypotonia. Also noted in some patients were hypospadias, intrauterine growth retardation, microcephaly and cryptorchidism, but most patients did not survive the neonatal period.

Another mutation (c.366A>T) in the second exon of this gene caused an amino acid substitution (Y112X), resulting in Nuclear Type 2 Mitochondrial Complex V deficiency symptomized by lactic acidosis, psychomotor retardation, facial dysmorphism, hypertrophic cardiomyopathy, and hypospadia.

A study of mitochondrial morphology in patients with mutations in this gene revealed disorganization of the mitochondrial nucleoid. Mitochondria were abnormal, with whorled cristae and disrupted nucleoid clusters of mtDNA. The nucleoids and mitochondrial respiratory chain complexes were confined to the outer rings of the whorls.

Interactions 
The encoded protein has protein-protein interactions with RAB2A, PHC2, NDUFAF8, NDUFS5, COX6B1, ECSIT, NDUFAF4, and COA3.

References

Further reading